Arzachel is a relatively young lunar impact crater located in the highlands in the south-central part of the visible Moon, close to the zero meridian (the visible center of the Moon). It lies to the south of the crater Alphonsus, and together with Ptolemaeus further north the three form a prominent line of craters to the east of Mare Nubium. The smaller Alpetragius lies to the northwest, and Thebit is to the southwest along the edge of the mare.

Description 

Arzachel is remarkably clear in its structure and a favorite telescope viewing subject for advanced amateur astronomers. The rim of Arzachel shows little sign of wear and has a detailed terrace structure on the interior, especially on the slightly higher eastern rim. There is a rough outer rampart that joins a ridge running from the north rim to southern rim of Alphonsus.

The rugged central peak of Arzachel is prominent, rising 1.5 kilometers above the floor, and is somewhat offset to the west with a bowed curve from south to north-northeast. The floor is relatively flat, except for some irregularities in the southwestern quadrant of the crater. There is a rille system named the Rimae Arzachel that runs from the northern wall to the southeast rim. A small crater lies prominently in the floor to the east of the central peak, with a pair of smaller craterlets located nearby.

Names

Arzachel is a Latinization of the name of the Arab astronomer and mathematician Abū Ishāq Ibrāhīm al-Zarqālī. Like many of the craters on the Moon's near side, Arzachel was named by Giovanni Riccioli, whose 1651 nomenclature system has become standardized. Earlier lunar cartographers had given the feature different names: Michael van Langren's 1645 map calls it "Annae, Reg. Fran.", after Anne, the Regent of France, and Johannes Hevelius called it "Mons Cragus" after one of the Mount Craguses of the ancient world.

Satellite craters

By convention these features are identified on lunar maps by placing the letter on the side of the crater midpoint that is closest to Arzachel.

References

External links

Arzachel at The Moon Wiki
Arzachel mapped and illustrated
 
 
 
 
 

 
 

Impact craters on the Moon